Felix J. Grucci Jr. (born November 25, 1951) is an American politician from New York who served in the United States House of Representatives from New York's 1st congressional district as a member of the Republican Party.

Early life

Felix J. Grucci Jr. was born on November 25, 1951, in Brookhaven, New York, to Felix J. Grucci Sr. and Concetta DiDio. In 1970, he graduated from Bellport High School. After graduating from high school he started working for his family's business, Fireworks by Grucci.

Career

Politics

From 1988 to 1991, Grucci served on the Suffolk County planning commission.

In 1990, he received the Republican nomination to run in a special election for a seat in the New York State Assembly to replace John Powell, who had resigned after winning election to the Brookhaven Town Board. In the election he was defeated by former Assemblyman William Bianchi.

From 1991 to 1993, Grucci served as the chairman of Brookhaven's Zoning Board of Appeals. On January 5, 1993, he was appointed to the Brookhaven Town Board to fill the vacancy created by John Powell after he accepted a position on the Suffolk County Board of Elections. In 1995, he defeated Democratic nominee Thomas Oberle to win election as Brookhaven Town Supervisor.

U.S. House of Representatives

2000

On March 20, 2000, Grucci announced that he would run for the Republican nomination in New York's 1st congressional district. Incumbent Representative Michael Forbes, who had switched his political affiliation from Republican to Democratic, was defeated in the Democratic primary by Regina Seltzer. In the general election Grucci defeated Seltzer with 133,020 votes to her 97,299.

During the election Grucci was endorsed by Arizona Senator John McCain, Suffolk County Republican Chairman Tony Apollaro, Suffolk County Clerk Ed Romaine, Assembly-member Pat Accampora, Brookhaven Town Counciler John LaValle, Southold Town Counciler Bill Moore, and Southampton Village trustee Bill Manger.

2002

During the 2002 congressional elections Grucci released a radio advertisement which stated that Tim Bishop had "turned his back" on rape victims at Southampton College. Grucci was criticized for the advertisement and Bishop filed a lawsuit to prevent the advertisement from being played. Amy Walter stated that the advertisement was "a big turning point in this contest" as it was initially predicted that Grucci would easily win reelection.

In the general election Bishop narrowly defeated Grucci with 84,276 votes to 81,524.

Later life

In 2013, Grucci and his sister, Donna Grucci Butler, stepped down as presidents of Fireworks by Grucci and were succeeded by their nephew, Felix Grucci III.

Political positions

On October 10, 2002, Grucci voted in favor of the Authorization for Use of Military Force Against Iraq Resolution of 2002.

Electoral history

References

External links

1951 births
Living people
People from East Patchogue, New York
American businesspeople
American people of Italian descent
Republican Party members of the United States House of Representatives from New York (state)
Town supervisors in New York (state)
21st-century American politicians